Vesicular glutamate transporter 1 (VGLUT1) is a protein that in humans is encoded by the SLC17A7 gene.

The protein encoded by this gene is a vesicle-bound, sodium-dependent phosphate transporter that is specifically expressed in the neuron-rich regions of the brain. It is preferentially associated with the membranes of synaptic vesicles and functions in glutamate transport. The protein shares 82% identity with the differentiation-associated Na-dependent inorganic phosphate cotransporter and they appear to form a distinct class within the Na+/Pi cotransporter family.

See also
 Solute carrier family

References

Further reading

Solute carrier family
Neurotransmitter transporters
Glutamate (neurotransmitter)